The 2021 Grand Prix de Denain – Porte du Hainaut was the 62nd edition of the Grand Prix de Denain, a one-day road cycling race in and around Denain in northern France. This edition was the race's first in the UCI ProSeries; the 2020 edition was expected to feature in the inaugural UCI ProSeries but was cancelled due to the COVID-19 pandemic. It was also the eleventh event of the 2021 French Road Cycling Cup. Additionally, the race was originally due to be held on 18 March but was postponed by COVID-19 precautions.

Teams 
Eight of the 19 UCI WorldTeams, nine UCI ProTeams, and two UCI Continental teams made up the nineteen teams that participated in the race. , with six riders, was the only team to not enter a full squad of seven riders. In total, 132 riders started the race, of which 86 finished.

UCI WorldTeams

 
 
 
 
 
 
 
 

UCI ProTeams

 
 
 
 
 
 
 
 
 

UCI Continental Teams

Result

References

Sources

External links 
 

2021
Grand Prix de Denain
Grand Prix de Denain
Grand Prix de Denain
Grand Prix de Denain
Grand Prix de Denain